In the Good Old Days (When Times Were Bad) is the third solo studio album by American singer-songwriter Dolly Parton. It was released on February 3, 1969, by RCA Victor. The album was produced by Bob Ferguson. It peaked at number 15 on the Billboard Top Country Albums chart. The album's title track was the only single released and it peaked at number 25 on the Billboard Hot Country Songs chart.

Recording
Recording sessions for the album began at RCA Studio B in Nashville, Tennessee, on September 9 and 10, 1968. One additional session followed on October 9.

Content
In the title  song, Parton looks back on her impoverished upbringing, concluding that while she values the lessons it taught her, she would not want to go back. The humorous "He's a Go Getter" plays on an unexpected pun, "When his wife gets off from work, he'll go get 'er." Parton also covers the Jeannie C. Riley hit "Harper Valley PTA", Tammy Wynette's "D-I-V-O-R-C-E",  and Porter Wagoner's hit, "The Carroll County Accident".

Parton re-recorded the title song for her 1973 album My Tennessee Mountain Home.

Parton re-recorded "The Carroll County Accident" with Buck Trent for his 2018 album Spartanburg Blues.

Release and promotion
The album was released February 3, 1969, on LP and 8-track.

Singles
The album's only single, "In the Good Old Days (When Times Were Bad)", was released in October 1968 and debuted at number 54 on the Billboard Hot Country Songs chart dated November 16. It peaked at number 25 on the chart dated December 21, its sixth week on the chart. It charted for a total of 11 weeks.

Critical reception

The review published in the February 15, 1969 issue of Billboard said, "Without doubt this will be a big hit LP for Dolly Parton... just as it will be considered a great package of entertainment by her friends. The key to the LP is her empathy on "In the Good Old Day (When Times Were Bad)", but also she tugs the heartstrings on "D-I-V-O-R-C-E" and gets through to the emotion on "The Carrol County Accident"."

Cashbox published a review of the album, saying that, "Gaining in strength as one of the more popular country female artists, Dolly Parton follows up her chart single of "In the Good Old Days (When Times Were Bad)" with a strong LP that should solidify her position with the disk buyers. In addition to her own hit single, the LP features such monster titles as "D-I-V-O-R-C-E" and "Harper Valley PTA", among others."

AllMusic rated the album 3.5 out of 5 stars.

Commercial performance
The album debuted at number 35 on the Billboard Top Country Albums chart dated March 1, 1969. It peaked at number 15 on the chart dated March 29, its fifth week on the chart, where it remained for two weeks. It charted for a total of 11 weeks.

Reissues
The album was reissued on cassette in Germany in 1987 and CD in Portugal in 1997. It was released as a digital download on July 26, 2019.

Track listing

Personnel
Adapted from the album liner notes and RCA recording session records.

Joseph Babcock – background vocals
Kenneth Buttrey – drums
Jerry Carrigan – drums
Dolores Edgin – background vocals
Bob Ferguson – producer
Lloyd Green – steel
Junior Huskey – bass
Mack Magaha – fiddle
George McCormick – rhythm guitar
Wayne Moss – guitar
Al Pachucki – recording engineer
June Page – background vocals
Dolly Parton – lead vocals, liner notes
Jerry Reed – guitar
Hargus Robbins – piano
Jerry Stembridge – guitar
Buck Trent – electric banjo

Charts

Release history

References

Dolly Parton albums
1969 albums
Albums produced by Bob Ferguson (music)
RCA Records albums